Ngosa is an African name that may refer to:


Given name 
Ngosa Simbyakula (born 1954), Zambian diplomat
Ngosa Sunzu (born 1998), Zambian footballer

Zambian surnames
Zambian given names
Bemba-language surnames
Bemba-language given names